Picture This is an album by vibraphonist Gary Burton released on the ECM label in 1982. It features Burton’s early 1980s quartet of alto saxophonist Jim Odgren, bassist Steve Swallow and drummer Mike Hyman.

Reception 
The Allmusic review by Scott Yanow awarded the album 3 stars stating "Burton always had the ability to blend in with nearly anyone, and the alto/vibes frontline is attractive... Well-played, if not overly memorable music".

Track listing 
 "Tanglewood '63" (Michael Gibbs) - 9:00
 "Waltz" (Chick Corea) - 6:00
 "Dreams So Real" (Carla Bley) - 7:14
 "Tierra Del Fuego" (Jim Odgren) - 7:07
 "Duke Ellington's Sound of Love" (Charles Mingus) - 8:13
 "Skylight" (Odgren) - 7:13

Personnel 
 Gary Burton — vibraphone
 Jim Odgren — alto saxophone
 Steve Swallow — electric bass
 Mike Hyman — drums

References 

ECM Records albums
Gary Burton albums
1982 albums